Mehedi Hasan Rana (born 1 January 1997) is a first-class cricketer from Bangladesh. In December 2015 he was named in Bangladesh's squad for the 2016 Under-19 Cricket World Cup.

Career

Bangladesh Premier League
He made his Twenty20 debut for Comilla Victorians on 5 November 2017 in the 2017–18 Bangladesh Premier League. In October 2018, he was named in the squad for the Sylhet Sixers team, following the draft for the 2018–19 Bangladesh Premier League.

Under-19 career
In November 2019, he was named in Bangladesh's squad for the 2019 ACC Emerging Teams Asia Cup in Bangladesh. Later the same month, he was named in Bangladesh's squad for the cricket tournament at the 2019 South Asian Games. The Bangladesh team won the gold medal, after they beat Sri Lanka by seven wickets in the final.

In November 2021, he was selected to play for the Kandy Warriors following the players' draft for the 2021 Lanka Premier League.

References

External links
 

1997 births
Living people
Bangladeshi cricketers
Chittagong Division cricketers
Sheikh Jamal Dhanmondi Club cricketers
Legends of Rupganj cricketers
Comilla Victorians cricketers
Sylhet Strikers cricketers
South Asian Games gold medalists for Bangladesh
South Asian Games medalists in cricket
People from Chandpur District